Mohammed Aboul-Fotouh Hassab was an Egyptian gastro-intestinal surgeon. He is known for the description of his operation Hassab's decongestion operation for the treatment of oesophageal varices as a result of portal hypertension.  Hassab was one of the surgery professors in medical school at Alexandria University in Egypt.

Activities
Hassab Operation, which is the treatment of bleeding esophageal varices, is taught in surgery world books.

Sources
 الموسوعة القومية للشخصيات المصرية البارزة ج2
EGYNEWS.NET
Alexandria medical school

1913 births
2000 deaths
Cairo University alumni
Academic staff of Cairo University
Academic staff of Alexandria University
Egyptian surgeons
20th-century surgeons